The Viking Award is awarded annually to the best Swedish ice hockey player in North America. The winner is decided by a vote among all Swedish-born players participating in the NHL or the NHL farm-team leagues. Only Mats Sundin has received the award four times. Peter Forsberg, Markus Näslund, Börje Salming, Henrik Zetterberg and Erik Karlsson have received it three times.

Winners

Source:
This article is translated from the corresponding article of the Swedish Wikipedia, retrieved 20 February 2022.

See also
 Kharlamov Trophy

Swedish ice hockey trophies and awards
National Hockey League trophies and awards